Paul Pawlak Sr. (July 28, 1917 – February 23, 2014) was an American electrician and politician.

Born in Shelton, Connecticut, Pawlak graduated from Seymour High School in Seymour, Connecticut and worked as an electrician for forty years. He served in local government as a selectman and on the board of education. He also served in the Connecticut House of Representatives from 1961 to 1969 and 1975 to 1979 as a Democrat. Pawlak died in Cheshire, Connecticut on February 23, 2014, at the age of 96.

References

1917 births
2014 deaths
People from Shelton, Connecticut
School board members in Connecticut
Democratic Party members of the Connecticut House of Representatives